Pangaea is a public art work by artist Michaela Mahady, on the east side of Milwaukee, Wisconsin on the campus of the University of Wisconsin–Milwaukee. The mixed media work incorporates concrete, brick, stone, steel, ceramic tile and colored leaded glass into a pavilion crowned with images of technology. Pangaea represents the global nature of today's world. The artwork is located in a courtyard behind the Sheldon B. Lubar School of Business and was funded by the Wisconsin Arts Board's Percent for Art program.

See also
 Three Bronze Discs
 Milwaukee
 Happy-Go-Luckies of Nature and Technology
 Polyphony
 Jantar-Mantar
 Float
 Lapham Memorial

References

Outdoor sculptures in Milwaukee
1997 sculptures